Müller's larva or Mulleria is a larva of some Polycladida. It has 8-fold symmetry and is somewhat like a ctenophore.  Müller’s larva is ciliated and has several paired and unpaired lobes. The cilia on the lobes are longer than cilia on the rest of the body. At the anterior and posterior ends of the larva are tufts of longer cilia (apical and caudal). The apical tuft originates from the apical organ, a sensory structure associated with the central nervous system.

It is named after Johannes Peter Müller (1801-1858), a German physiologist who invented the plankton net, and first described larval forms of many phyla.

References 

Larvae